The Grammy Award for Best Engineered Recording – Special or Novel Effects was awarded from 1960 to 1965.  The award had several minor name changes:

From 1960 to 1961 the award was known as Best Engineering Contribution – Novelty Recording
From 1962 to 1963 it was awarded as Best Engineered Recording – Novelty 
From 1964 to 1965 it was awarded as Best Engineered Recording – Special or Novel Effects

This award was presented alongside the awards for Best Engineered Album, Non-Classical and Best Engineered Album, Classical.

Years reflect the year in which the Grammy Awards were presented, for works released in the previous year.

Recipients

References

Engineered Recording Special or Novel Effects